Mokko  may refer to:

Mokko, Niger, a village and rural commune in Niger
 a type of fundoshi, a Japanese undergarment
 stage name of Maureen Koech, Kenyan actress, songwriter and singer
 Mount Mokko, near Mount Hachimantai, Japan

See also
 MokkoStudio, a Canadian visual effects and animation firm
Tendo Mokko, a Japanese furniture maker